Braian Nahuel Aguirre (born 28 July 2000) is an Argentine professional footballer who plays as a defender for Lanús.

Career
Aguirre came through the youth ranks of Lanús. His first-team breakthrough arrived in October 2020, with the defender making his senior debut in a Copa Sudamericana second stage, first leg home win over São Paulo on 28 October; he was substituted off for Franco Orozco early in the second half, as he was again days later in the Copa de la Liga Profesional against Boca Juniors on 31 October. He scored his first senior goal on 4 November, netting in the Sudamericana second leg against São Paulo as his club progressed on away goals following a 6–6 aggregate draw.

Career statistics
.

Notes

References

External links

2000 births
Living people
People from Almirante Brown Partido
Argentine footballers
Association football defenders
Club Atlético Lanús footballers
Sportspeople from Buenos Aires Province